Niu Zhiyuan (born 13 December 1973) is a Chinese sport shooter who competed in the 2000 Summer Olympics.

References

1973 births
Living people
Chinese male sport shooters
Running target shooters
Olympic shooters of China
Shooters at the 2000 Summer Olympics
Olympic bronze medalists for China
Olympic medalists in shooting
Shooters at the 2002 Asian Games
Asian Games medalists in shooting
World record holders in shooting
Medalists at the 2000 Summer Olympics
Asian Games gold medalists for China
Medalists at the 2002 Asian Games
Sport shooters from Beijing
21st-century Chinese people